Yaaqov Medan (sometimes spelled, Yaakov or Ya'acov) (born 1950) is an Israeli Orthodox rabbi, co-Rosh yeshiva of Yeshivat Har Etzion, a respected leader in the Religious-Zionist community, and a lecturer in Tanakh, Gemara, and Jewish philosophy.

Biography
Yaakov Medan was a member of the first class at Yeshivat Har Etzion, and has lived in Gush Etzion since 1968.

He served in the Airborne Nahal Infantry unit during his Hesder army service. During the Yom Kippur War, he fought in the Golan Heights as a liaison officer in the Yiftach Brigade.

Medan holds a B.Ed degree from Michlalah Jerusalem College, and an MA degree from Touro College.

Rabbinic career
Together with Rabbi Baruch Gigi, Rabbi Medan joined Rabbi Yehuda Amital and Rabbi Aharon Lichtenstein as a Rosh Yeshiva on January 4, 2006.

His Biblical analysis does not shy away from nuanced analysis of the patriarchs and other Biblical figures in innovative commentaries on Tanakh, which combine lucid textual analysis with intimate knowledge of geographical and historical realia, and of a vast body of Jewish tradition. He has published book-length studies on Daniel, Ruth, and the Batsheva story. A much wider variety of lectures which he has given at Yeshivat Har Etzion have not yet been published in written form.

He was a partner in drafting the Gavison-Medan Covenant,
a proposed constitution for the State of Israel which is intended to benefit Israel's religious and secular communities simultaneously (despite their disagreement on a number of issues).

References

Religious Zionist rosh yeshivas
1950 births
21st-century rabbis in Jerusalem
Living people
Religious Zionist Orthodox rabbis
Israeli Orthodox Jews
Israeli Orthodox rabbis
Yeshivat Har Etzion
Israeli settlers
Israeli people of Polish-Jewish descent
Israeli soldiers
Jewish military personnel
Touro College alumni